Residence may refer to various parts of English law including taxation, immigration, and family law.  This article deals exclusively with English family law.  See residence in English law for disambiguation.

In family law, the Court can order a Residence Order of the Family Court under section 8 of The Children Act 1989 following the breakdown of a marriage and determining where the children are to live and with whom. The order can be sole or joint, and if joint, it can be made to a couple regardless whether they are married. If a residence order is granted, this automatically gives him, her, or them parental responsibility for the child(ren) which will continue until the order terminates (usually this will be until the child(ren) reach their sixteenth birthday unless there are exceptional circumstances justifying a longer period).

Eligibility
The following can make an application for a Residence Order under section 8 of The Children Act 1989 as of right:
the parent or guardian of the child(ren);
a married stepparent of the child(ren) where the child(ren) lived with the stepparent as child(ren) of the family;
anyone with whom the child has lived for at least three years (this period need not have been continuous but must have been recent).
anyone who:
a) where there is already a Residence Order in place has the consent of every one who holds that Order, or
b) who has the consent of the local authority where the child is in their care, or
c) has the consent of every one who has parental responsibility for the child.
If an applicant cannot apply for the Order as of right, (e.g. they are wider family members such as grandparents etc. who wish to seek orders for their grandchildren), they can make an application to the court seeking leave to issue the application. In deciding whether to grant leave, the court will consider, amongst other things:
the nature of the application,
the applicant's connection with the child, and
the risk that the proposed application might disrupt the child(ren)'s life to such an extent that they should be harmed by it.

The welfare principle
As a matter of public policy, the courts have always operated under the doctrine of parens patriae to make the best interests of any children their first and paramount concern. From time to time, this doctrine has been included in statutes, the most recent relevant version being section 1 of The Children Act 1989 which requires the court to consider the "welfare checklist".  Before making a section 8 order (i.e. a residence order) the court must consider:
The ascertainable wishes and feelings of each child concerned (considered in light of his or her age and understanding);
His or her physical, emotional and/or educational needs;
The likely effect on him or her of any change in the circumstances;
His or her age, sex, background and any other characteristics which the court considers relevant;
Any harm which he or she has suffered or is at risk of suffering;
How capable each of his parents and any other person in relation to whom the court considers the question to be relevant, is of meeting his or her needs;
The range of powers available to the court under the Children Act 1989 in the proceedings in question.
A child is not automatically a party to the proceedings and will be represented by a Guardian ad litem unless the court considers it necessary. If a Guardian is appointed but the children and the Guardian do not agree on what recommendations to make to the court and the children are of sufficient age and understanding, they will be able to instruct a solicitor directly to represent their views and the Guardian will present an independent view to the court. Whether or not a Guardian is appointed, the court can request a Welfare Report under section 7 of The Children Act 1989, either from the local authority where the child currently resides or from a Children and Family Reporter who is an officer appointed by CAFCASS. The report will usually inform the court of the child's wishes and feelings, but the officer will recommend what he or she thinks is in the child's best interests in the circumstances of the case rather than just advocate the child's wishes.

English family law
Child custody